"I Won't Be Home No More" is a song recorded by Hank Williams on July 11, 1952.  It was released posthumously on MGM Records a year later in July 1953.  The song climbed to No. 4 on the US Billboard National Best Sellers chart.

Background
It was recorded at the same session that produced "You Win Again" and has a similar theme, albeit in a more blithesome tone, that probably reflects Hank's bitterness towards his ex-wife Audrey Williams (Hank and Audrey were legally divorced the day before the session).  As Colin Escott notes, "Even though it's  to be a lighthearted song, Hank seems vindictive, even spiteful." It was recorded at Castle Studio in Nashville with Jerry Rivers (fiddle), Don Helms (steel guitar), and Harold Bradley (rhythm guitar), while it is speculated that Chet Atkins played lead guitar and Ernie Newton played bass.

Discography

Sources

References

Hank Williams songs
1952 songs
Songs written by Hank Williams
Song recordings produced by Fred Rose (songwriter)
MGM Records singles